Ysgol Glan y Môr is a bilingual comprehensive school in the market town of Pwllheli in the Welsh county of Gwynedd. The school serves a large part of the Llŷn Peninsula. As of 2022, there were 495 pupils on roll at the school. According to the latest Estyn inspection report in 2017, approximately three-quarters of pupils come from Welsh-speaking homes.

History
The modern school was formed when the former Pwllheli Grammar School and the Frondeg Secondary Modern Schools merged. These occupied sites at Ysgol Penrallt (Now home to the Pwllheli campus of Coleg Meirion-Dwyfor) and Upper Ala Road, respectively. The two schools merged in mid-1969 to form a comprehensive school.

The junior pupils (First Year and Second Year) were located at the Ysgol Penrallt site and the senior pupils (Third Year and upwards) were located at a new building constructed on Cardiff Road. This new school was subsequently expanded to accommodate all pupils in the 1990s.

Notable former pupils

 Gwyneth Glyn - poet and singer
 Sir David Hughes Parry(1893-1973) was Vice-Chancellor of London University from 1945 to 1948 (attended Pwllheli county school)
 Hywel Williams - politician

References

External links
 School Website

Secondary schools in Gwynedd
Educational institutions established in 1969
Glan y Mor
Pwllheli
1969 establishments in Wales